Richard Lyons (born 8 August 1979) is a British motor racing driver that competed in the Japanese Super GT series.

Junior Formula

Born in Hillsborough, County Down, Lyons started in Formula Vauxhall Junior in Britain winning the Winter Series in 1996, before finishing the regular championship sixth in 1997 and second in 1998. He then moved to Formula Palmer Audi, finishing second in the 1999 Championship. He drove in Formula Renault 2000 with not much success.

Formula Nippon / A1 Grand Prix

He drove Formula Nippon in Japan from 2001 to 2005 winning the Championship in 2004 and finishing third in 2005.

He has also run in the A1 Grand Prix series for the A1 Team Ireland for the 2006–07 season.  He started all up fourteen races with four top ten finishes.

Japanese GT's

He drove GT and Sports Cars in Japan for nine years between 2002 and 2010. His best finish was in 2004 where he won the All-Japan GT Championship GT500 Championship. All in all he started over seventy races for ten wins in that period.

For 2013 he is racing in an Audi R8 LMS in the Japanese GT300 SuperGT Championship.

V8 Supercars

Lyons also made occasional appearances in V8 Supercar, with a best finish of fifth place sharing a Triple Eight Race Engineering Ford Falcon, in the 2007 Bathurst 1000, sharing the car with Australian-based Danish GT racer Allan Simonsen. He returned in 2011 and drove for Tekno Autosports sharing with Jonathon Webb at Phillip Island and Bathurst. Then he joined Ford Performance Racing to replace an injured Will Power at the 2011 Gold Coast 600, finishing the two races Third and First with Mark Winterbottom.

Career results

Complete JGTC/Super GT results
(key) (Races in bold indicate pole position) (Races in italics indicate fastest lap)

Complete Formula Nippon results
(key) (Races in bold indicate pole position) (Races in italics indicate fastest lap)

Complete A1 Grand Prix results
(key) (Races in bold indicate pole position) (Races in italics indicate fastest lap)

V8 Supercar results

† Not Eligible for points

References

External links
 
 Lyons secures second title. Retrieved BBC Sports Webpage

1979 births
Living people
Racing drivers from Northern Ireland
Formula Palmer Audi drivers
British Formula Renault 2.0 drivers
Japanese Formula 3 Championship drivers
Super GT drivers
Formula Nippon drivers
Supercars Championship drivers
A1 Team Ireland drivers
European Le Mans Series drivers
International GT Open drivers
Asian Le Mans Series drivers
British GT Championship drivers
Status Grand Prix drivers
A1 Grand Prix drivers
Nismo drivers
Mugen Motorsports drivers
TOM'S drivers
Dandelion Racing drivers
Aston Martin Racing drivers
Audi Sport drivers
Porsche Motorsports drivers
AF Corse drivers
W Racing Team drivers
Craft-Bamboo Racing drivers